Kunjali Marakkar is a historical  figure of Kerala.

It may also refer to:

 Kunjali Marakkar (film) ,1966 Malayalam film of the same name.
 Kunjali Marakkar School of Marine Engineering, a Marine engineering college in Kochi, Kerala.
 Marakkar: Arabikadalinte Simham, 2020 Malayalam movie.
 Marakkar, a South Asian Muslim community.